Závada is a municipality and village in Opava District in the Moravian-Silesian Region of the Czech Republic. It has about 600 inhabitants. It is part of the historic Hlučín Region.

History
The first written mention of Závada is from 1349.

References

External links

Villages in Opava District
Hlučín Region